Railsback is a surname. Notable people with the surname include:

Alexis Railsback (born 1995), American beauty pageant winner
Dick Railsback (born 1946), American pole vaulter
Harold Railsback, football coach for the Eastern Illinois University Panthers in Charleston, Illinois, USA
Steve Railsback (born 1945), American theatre, film and television actor, born in Dallas, Texas
Tom Railsback (1932–2020), served in the United States Congress from 1967 to 1983 for Moline, Illinois

See also
Railsback curve, the physical properties of the piano which affect its acoustics